Retd. Major General Shahzad Naeem Khan, HI(M) is a former two star rank Pakistani army officer who retired in 2021.

Education
He received his education from Pakistan Command and Staff College and the National Defence University of Pakistan.

Military career
The selection board of Pakistan Army approved his promotion from Brigadier to the rank of Major General in February 2014.

The President of Pakistan on 23 March 2016 granted the Hilal-i-Imtiaz (Military) award to Maj Gen Shahzad Naeem Khan.

He had a stint at the UN Peace Mission in Africa and served as Defence Attaché at the Pakistani High Commission in Dhaka, Bangladesh.

He is of the opinion that only providing quality education and grooming influence on mind, character or physical ability of an individual. Under his supervision and valuable service Army Public School and College Malir transformed into an all-encompassing institutions and to its students offering best learning atmosphere.
He looking after project of Cadet College Gadap to make it one of the best educational institutions of not only of Pakistan but also of Asia. The project covers 100 acres.

He believes that terrorism risk could only be reduced if nations cooperate to bring war against terrorism to logical conclusion.

He was amongst 24 army officials who were superseded in 2016.

Later life
He later joined the Nutshell Group as Chief Public Affairs Officer on 2 October 2021.

References

Pakistan Military Academy alumni
Living people
Pakistani generals
National Defence University, Pakistan alumni
Pakistan Army personnel
Pashtun people
Year of birth missing (living people)
Recipients of Hilal-i-Imtiaz
Pakistan Army officers